Messier 47 (M47 or NGC 2422) is an open cluster in the mildly southern constellation of Puppis. It was discovered by Giovanni Batista Hodierna before 1654 and in his then keynote work re-discovered by Charles Messier on 1771. It was also independently discovered by Caroline Herschel.

There is no cluster in the position indicated by Messier, which he expressed in terms of its right ascension and declination with respect to the star 2 Puppis.  However, if the signs (+ and −) he wrote are swapped, the position matches. Until this equivalency was found, M47 was considered a lost Messier Object. This identification as the same thing (ad idem) only came in 1959 with a realization by Canadian astronomer T. F. Morris.

M47 is centered about 1,600 light-years away and is about 78 million years old. The member stars have been measured down to about red dwarfs at apparent magnitude 19.  There are around 500 members, the brightest being HD 60855, a magnitude 5.7 Be star. The cluster is dominated by hot class B main sequence and giant stars, but a noticeable colour contrast comes from its brightest red giants.

It about a degree from Messier 46, which is much older and much further away.

Gallery

See also
 List of Messier objects

References and footnotes

External links
 
 Messier 47, SEDS Messier pages
 Messier 47 Amateur Image - Waid Observatory
 

Messier 047
Messier 047
047
Messier 047
Orion–Cygnus Arm
?